Muhammad Shamil bin Sharif (born 8 May 1992) is a Singaporean professional footballer who currently plays as a midfielder for Warriors in the S.League, Singapore's top tier of professional football.

International career 
Shamil currently represents Singapore internationally in the U23 team, having also featured for the U21 and U22 teams previously. He received his first call-up back in 2012 for the 2012 Hassanal Bolkial Trophy tournament, which took place at the Hassanal Bolkial National Stadium in the Philippines. Shamil was also part of the selected Singapore U21 squad that took part in the Vietnam Newspaper Cup 2012, a cup competition hosted annually by the Vietnam Football Federation to prepare the youth players for playing at the U23 level as well as in senior competitive football. Shamil was also named by the Football Association of Singapore the following year in the 20-men squad participating in the Thanh Nien Under-21 International Football Tournament 2013. On 27 May 2015, Shamil was revealed as part of the final 20-men squad selected to play for Singapore in the 2015 Southeast Asian Games.

Career statistics

References

External links 
 

1992 births
Living people
Singaporean footballers
Association football midfielders
Tanjong Pagar United FC players
Young Lions FC players
Home United FC players
Singapore Premier League players